Trigonobalanus verticillata is a species of plant in the family Fagaceae. It is a tree native to Borneo, Sumatra, Sulawesi, the Malay Peninsula, and Hainan.

Description
Trigonobalanus verticillata is a tree which grows 10 to 20 meters tall. The trunk has a diameter of 30 to 70 cm at breast height. It fruits between October and March.

Range and habitat
Trigonobalanus verticillata is native to the highlands of Borneo, Sumatra, Sulawesi, the Malay Peninsula, and Hainan.

It is found in tropical montane rain forest and evergreen broadleaf forest in Indonesia and Malaysia, and in tropical moist monsoon forest on Hainan, between 900 and 2,000 meters elevation.

On Hainan its often found with the trees Castanopsis tonkinensis, Lithocarpus fenzelianus, Liquidambar obovata, and Dacrydium pectinatum.

Conservation
The species' conservation status is assessed as near threatened. It is threatened with habitat loss and fragmentation from deforestation, and its population is declining.

References

Fagaceae
Flora of Malesia
Flora of Hainan
Flora of the Borneo montane rain forests